Mateos Toçi (born 16 May 1993) is an Albanian professional footballer who most recently played as a midfielder for Dinamo Tirana in the Albanian First Division.

Club career
On 19 January 2018, Toçi returned to Elbasani after only half a season.

Style of play
Toçi has been compared to former Elbasani player Dorian Bylykbashi.

Career statistics

Club

Honours
Elbasani
Albanian First Division: 2013–14

References

External links
 Profile - FSHF

1993 births
Living people
Footballers from Elbasan
Albanian footballers
Association football midfielders
Albania youth international footballers
KF Elbasani players
KF Gramshi players
FK Dinamo Tirana players
Kategoria Superiore players
Kategoria e Parë players